The NCAA Division II Rowing Championship is a rowing championship held by the NCAA for Division II women's heavyweight (or openweight) collegiate crews.

The reigning champions are Mercyhurst, who won their second team national title in 2022.

The most successful program has been Western Washington, with eight titles.

Format 
The NCAA Division II Women's Rowing Championships comprise 68 total competitors (86 including spares) and two events, varsity eights and fours. Four teams are selected, each of which is required to field an eight and a four. Two additional at-large schools are selected to field only an eight. The following criteria are used in selecting teams and individual boats:

Regional ranking; regional championship results. 
Results against regionally ranked teams; results against teams already selected; results against common opponents. 
Head-to-head competition; late-season performance. 
Eligibility and availability of student-athletes.

Scoring 
Eights: 1st-12pts, 2nd-9pts, 3rd-6pts, 4th-5pts.
Fours: 1st-8pts, 2nd-6pts, 3rd-4pts.

Results

Team champions

Event champions

Fours

II Eights

I Eights

See also
Intercollegiate Women's Varsity Eights
Intercollegiate Rowing Association Women's Varsity Lightweight Eights Champions
NCAA Division I Rowing Championship
NCAA Division III Rowing Championship

References

External links
NCAA Division II Rowing

Rowing, Women's
College rowing competitions in the United States
Women's rowing in the United States